Spice Lisp (Scientific Personal Integrated Computing Environment) is a programming language, a dialect of Lisp. Its implementation, originally written by Carnegie Mellon University's (CMU) Spice Lisp Group, targeted the microcode of the 16-bit workstation PERQ, and its operating system Accent. It used that workstation's microcode abilities (and provided microcodes for the languages Pascal, C, and Ada) to implement a stack machine architecture to store its data structures as 32-bit objects and to enable run time type-checking. It would later be popular on other workstations.

Spice Lisp evolved into an implementation of Common Lisp, and was renamed CMU Common Lisp (CMUCL).

References

External links

FOLDOC

Common Lisp implementations
Lisp programming language family